WHEI (88.9 FM) is a radio station licensed to Tiffin, Ohio. The station is owned by Mark Boyer, through Soaring Eagle Promotions Inc.

On December 17, 2021, the station was rebranded as "Rise FM".

References

External links

HEI